This is a list of 145 genera in the subfamily Scelioninae.

Scelioninae genera

References